Marulew  is a village in the administrative district of Gmina Brudzew, within Turek County, Greater Poland Voivodeship, in west-central Poland.

The village has a population of 150.

References

Marulew